See also Zelman (surname)
Zelman, Zalman, or Zalmen is Jewish given name. Notable people with the name include:

Zelman Cowen (1919–2011), former Governor-General of Australia
Zelman Kleinstein (born 1910),  chess master
Zelman Passov (1905–1940), Soviet foreign intelligence official
Zalman Teitelbaum (born 1952), rabbi

See also
Zelman Symphony, Melbourne, Australia
Zelman v. Simmons-Harris United States Supreme Court case

Jewish given names